John McGovern VC (16 May 1825 – 22 November 1888) (Also known as McGOWAN) was born in the parish of Templeport in Tullyhaw, County Cavan, Ireland, was an Irish recipient of the Victoria Cross, the highest and most prestigious award for gallantry in the face of the enemy that can be awarded to British and Commonwealth forces.

Details
He was 32 years old, and a private in the 1st Bengal European Fusiliers  (later The Royal Munster Fusiliers), Bengal Army during the Indian Mutiny when the following deed took place on 23 June 1857 at Delhi, India for which he was awarded the VC:

Further information
McGovern emigrated to Canada and died in Hamilton, Ontario, in November 1888.

The medal
His Victoria Cross is displayed at the National Army Museum (Chelsea, England).

References

The Register of the Victoria Cross (1981, 1988 and 1997)

Ireland's VCs  (Dept of Economic Development, 1995)
Monuments to Courage (David Harvey, 1999)
Irish Winners of the Victoria Cross (Richard Doherty & David Truesdale, 2000)

Irish recipients of the Victoria Cross
People from County Cavan
1825 births
1888 deaths
19th-century Irish people
Irish soldiers in the British East India Company Army
Indian Rebellion of 1857 recipients of the Victoria Cross
British Army personnel of the Second Anglo-Burmese War
Irish emigrants to Canada (before 1923)
Military personnel from County Cavan
Burials in Ontario